Group B of the 2000 Fed Cup Europe/Africa Zone Group II was one of two pools in the Asia/Oceania Zone Group I of the 2000 Fed Cup. Five teams competed in a round robin competition, with the top team advancing to the Group I play-off, the winner of which would advance to World Group II Play-offs, and the bottom team being relegated down to 2000 Group II.

China vs. South Korea

Indonesia vs. New Zealand

Chinese Taipei vs. Singapore

China vs. Singapore

Indonesia vs. South Korea

Chinese Taipei vs. New Zealand

China vs. Indonesia

Chinese Taipei vs. South Korea

New Zealand vs. Singapore

China vs. New Zealand

Indonesia vs. Chinese Taipei

South Korea vs. Singapore

China vs. Chinese Taipei

Indonesia vs. Singapore

South Korea vs. New Zealand

  failed to win any ties in the pool, and thus was relegated to Group II in 2001, where they finished fourth overall.

See also
Fed Cup structure

References

External links
 Fed Cup website

2000 Fed Cup Asia/Oceania Zone